The B-Sides is a symphony in five movements for electronica and orchestra by the American composer Mason Bates.  The work was commissioned by the San Francisco Symphony and conductor Michael Tilson Thomas (to whom the piece is dedicated), with support from the Ralph I. Dorfman Commissioning Fund.  It was premiered May 20, 2009 at the Louise M. Davies Symphony Hall in San Francisco, with Michael Tilson Thomas leading the San Francisco Symphony.

Composition

Background and inspiration
Conductor Michael Tilson Thomas first approached Bates about the commission during a concert intermission between performances of Tchaikovsky and Brahms.  Bates wrote:

Structure
The work has a duration of roughly 22 minutes and is composed in five movements:
Broom of the System
Aerosol Melody (Hanalei)
Gemini in the Solar Wind
Temescal Noir
Warehouse Medicine

Instrumentation
The B-Sides is scored for electronica and orchestra, comprising two flutes (1st doubling piccolo), two oboes (2nd doubling English horn), E-flat clarinet (doubling bass clarinet), two clarinets (2nd doubling bass clarinet), two bassoons, contrabassoon, four French horns, three trumpets, two trombones, bass trombone, tuba, three percussionists, harp, piano, strings.

Reception
The B-Sides has received mostly positive responses from critics.  Joshua Kosman of the San Francisco Chronicle lauded the piece, writing:
Despite expressing misgivings for Bates's "rather self-consciously hip" style, Lawrence A. Johnson of the Chicago Classical Review called the symphony "much more substantial" and remarked, "Scored for large orchestra, The B-Sides shows that, despite his reputation as a composer whose music is dominated by rhythmic pop influences, Bates is at his finest and most convincing as a symphonic colorist working with a wide palette."  Richard Scheinin of the San Jose Mercury News wrote:

References

 2
2009 compositions
21st-century classical music
Music commissioned by the San Francisco Symphony